Dr. Set Aung who is also known as Dr. Winston Set Aung is currently held captive in a prison in Myanmar by the military after the coup along with (i.e. in the same case with) the Nobel Peace Laureate and the State Counsellor, Aung San Su Kyi and her economic advisor, Dr. Sean Turnell, an Australian professor. Dr. Turnnel was released and deported in late 2022.  Dr. Winston Set Aung is former Deputy Minister of the Ministry of Planning, Finance and Industry. He also had multiple roles as Chairperson of Thilawa Special Economic Zone's Management Committee of Myanmar, member of National Economic Coordination Committee (NECC) and Secretary of the Development Assistance Coordination Unit (DACU) that were chaired by the State Counsellor Aung San Su Kyi, until the Myanmar military launched a coup on 1st Feb 2021. Additionally, he was also the Secretary of Anti-Money Laundering and Countering the Financing of Terrorism Steering Committee chaired by the Vice President of Myanmar, Chairperson of the Kyaukphyu Special Economic Zone, Chairperson of the Myanmar National Airlines and a member of the Myanmar Investment Commission (MIC).

Before he held these positions, he served as Deputy Governor of the Central Bank of Myanmar until July 2017, Deputy Minister for National Planning and Economic Development from June 2012 to July 2013 and Economics Advisor to President Thein Sein from April 2011 to June 2012. He previously served as Director of Myanmar Development Resource Institute from September 2011 to May 2012 and Secretary of National Economic and Social Advisory Council of Myanmar from January 2011 to April 2012.

Early life and education

Set Aung earned a BSc degree in Industrial Chemistry from University of Yangon in 1995, an MBA in General Business Administration and Management from Yangon Institute of Economics in 1997, MSc in Banking and Finance from Stirling Management School, University of Stirling, UK in 1998, and an MSc in Investment Management from Cass Business School, City University London in 2001. He also holds a PhD degree in Media and Governance from the Keio University, Japan.

He has been involved in international and regional research projects related to economics, social and policy development in various countries, and has completed over 40 international and regional economic and social research projects in more than 10 countries.

Publications
Set Aung has authored research papers in cooperation with international and regional academic and policy institutes, including the University of Tokyo, Japan, the Institute for Security and Development Policy in Stockholm, Sweden, Chulalongkorn University in Bangkok, Thailand, Mekong Institute in Khon Kaen, Thailand, Stockholm Environmental Institute (SEI-Asia), and the Research Institute on Contemporary Southeast Asia of France, Paris.

Personal life
Set Aung's father, Set Maung, was formerly a deputy minister during the Burma Socialist Programme Party era.

References

Living people
Burmese economists
Government ministers of Myanmar
Alumni of Bayes Business School
University of Yangon alumni
Year of birth missing (living people)